RNP may refer to:

Medicine 
 Ribonucleoprotein, a compound of ribonucleic acid and protein
 Ribonucleoprotein particle, intracellular compartments involved in post-transcriptional fate
 Registered nurse practitioner

Military 
 Royal Navy Police, in the United Kingdom

Other 
 Rede Nacional de Ensino e Pesquisa, the academic Internet system of Brazil
 Required navigation performance for a specific procedure or block of airspace
 Rosa nel Pugno (RnP), or Rose in the Fist, a former Italian political federation around 2006
 Radio Northwick Park, a London hospital radio station
 Owosso Community Airport, Michigan, US, IATA code
 Radon–Nikodym property, in mathematics, a property of some Banach spaces, related to integration and differentiability
 Rassemblement National Populaire, a French fascist party active during World War Two